China, as the Republic of China, competed at the 1948 Summer Olympics in London, England, United Kingdom. 31 competitors, 30 men and 1 woman, took part in 11 events in 6 sports.

Athletics

Track&Road events

Basketball

Group B

|}

 39-44 
 36-34 
 49-48 
 32-51 
 125-25

Classification round

17-23
 42-34

17-20
 54-25

17-18
 38-54

Cycling

One male cyclist represented China in 1948.

Football

First round

Swimming

Men

Art competitions

Notes

References

External links
Official Olympic Reports

Nations at the 1948 Summer Olympics
1948 in China
Republic of China (1912–1949) at the Summer Olympics
1948 in Chinese sport